Tim Torn Teutenberg (born 19 June 2002) is a German cyclist, who currently rides for UCI Continental team .

He is from a family of cyclists: His father Lars, uncle Sven, aunt Ina-Yoko and sister Lea Lin are all current or former professional cyclists.

Major results

Track

2019
 UEC European Junior Championships
1st  Elimination race
3rd  Madison (with Luca Dreßler)
 National Junior Championships
1st  Omnium
1st  Madison (with Luca Dreßler)
 2nd  Elimination race, UCI World Junior Championships
2020
 UEC European Junior Championships
2nd  Omnium
3rd  Madison (with Benjamin Boos)
2021
 2nd  Elimination race, UEC European Under-23 Championships
2022
 National Championships
1st  Omnium
1st  Scratch race
1st  Elimination race
 UEC European Under-23 Championships
2nd  Omnium
2nd  Elimination race
3rd  Madison (with Malte Maschke)
 UCI Nations Cup
3rd Elimination race, Glasgow
3rd Elimination race, Milton
2023
 1st  Elimination race, UEC European Championships

Road
2019
 2nd Overall Tour de Gironde
1st Young rider classification
 9th Overall Internationale Cottbuser Junioren-Etappenfahrt
2022
 4th Overall Orlen Nations Grand Prix
 4th Midden–Brabant Poort Omloop
 6th Kattekoers
 8th Overall Le Triptyque des Monts et Chateaux
 8th Ronde van Overijssel
 9th Overall Olympia's Tour
 9th Visit Friesland Elfsteden Race

References

External links

2002 births
Living people
German male cyclists
German track cyclists
People from Mettmann
Sportspeople from Düsseldorf (region)
Cyclists from North Rhine-Westphalia